The 2007 UEFA Futsal Championship was the sixth official edition of the UEFA-governed European Championship for national futsal teams. It was held in Portugal, between November 16 and November 25, 2007, in two venues located in Porto's Greater Metropolitan Area — Gondomar and Santo Tirso municipalities. Eight teams competed in the final round, after a qualifying phase where seven teams managed to join the Portuguese hosts.

Spain, the 2000 FIFA Futsal World Championship and 2004 FIFA Futsal World Championship winners, successfully defended their European crown and added a fourth continental title to their record, by defeating Italy 3-1, in a reprise of the last FIFA Futsal World Championship final.

Bids
The Portuguese bid was selected during a meeting of UEFA's Executive Committee, on April 19, 2005, in Tallinn, Estonia. The bid was picked ahead of two other entries from the Netherlands (Eindhoven and Maastricht) and Bosnia and Herzegovina (Sarajevo), which had been previously shortlisted from nine preliminary bids.

Venues
The bid's proposed main venue was to be the 4,500-seated Rosa Mota Pavilion, in the heart of Porto, and a second venue would be located in the neighbouring Matosinhos municipality. However, on August 14, 2006 the tournament's main venue was switched to the future 3,800-seated arena in the Gondomar municipality — the Pavilhão Multiusos de Gondomar "Coração de Ouro" (. The second venue was also changed to Santo Tirso's Pavilhão Desportivo Municipal.

 Pavilhão Multiusos de Gondomar "Coração de Ouro"
 Pavilhão Municipal de Santo Tirso

Referees

 Alexandr Remin (Belarus)
 Antonio Jose Fernandes Cardoso (Portugal)
 Antonius Van Eekelen (Netherlands)
 Edi Šunjić (Croatia)
 Ivan Shabanov (Russia)
 Karel Henych (Czech Republic)

 Károly Török (Hungary)
 Massimo Cumbo (Italy)
 Oleg Ivanov (Ukraine)
 Pascal Lemal (Belgium)
 Roberto Gracia Marin (Spain)
 Vladimir Colbasiuc (Moldova)

Final tournament

Group stage

Group A

Group B

Knockout stage

Semi-finals

Third place play-off

Final

Champions

Final ranking

Top goalscorers

References

External links
 5th UEFA Futsal Championship - Portugal 2007, Futsal Planet
 Official UEFA website

 
UEFA Futsal Championship tournaments
International futsal competitions hosted by Portugal
UEFA
Futsal Championship, 2007
Sports competitions in Porto
UEFA Futsal Championship
21st century in Porto